Krivošije are a historical tribe and microregion in southwestern Montenegro, located on a high plateau belonging to the Orjen mountain range, north of the Bay of Kotor. Krivošije was historically located at a tripoint between the Principality of Montenegro, Austro-Hungarian (formerly Venetian) Bay of Kotor and Ottoman Sanjak of Herzegovina.

Name

It is speculated that the name of the region is derived from the last name Krivošić, which is mentioned in 15th century Ragusan sources. In Serbo-Croatian language, krivi (neutral form krivo) means "bent" or "crooked" оr "guilty", while šije (singular: šija) means "necks", and it may be derived from some ancestor with a deformity. It might also be derived from the word krv meaning blood, as in linked by blood relationships.

Origin 
During William James Stillman's travels, an American Journalist, in 1904, he listed the Krivošije (Crivoscians) as a Slavonic tribe.

Geography
Krivošije are a mountainous karst region above Risan, located at around 1000 metres above the sea level, spanning on 114 km2 of land. It is a high plateau on the northern and eastern branches of Mount Orjen (1894 m) in southwest Montenegro, near in the hinterland of the Bay of Kotor. A significant geological and geomorphological feature of the region are the glacial deposits distributed across the whole of the plateau. They were deposited by valley glaciers coming from Orjen during the Ice Age. Krivošije is the region with the greatest rainfall in Europe.

Reovačka greda is a mountain ridge located near Crkvice in central Krivošije, is the location of the region's highest peak Pazua (1769 m), which is used for trad climbing.

Settlements in the region include Crkvice (inhabited location with the highest annual precipitation in the Europe), Dragalj, Han, Malov Do, Knežlaz, Unijerina and Zvečava.

Climate
Krivošije are within the Mediterranean subtropical belt. While summers are hot and sunny, autumn, winter and spring are rainy seasons. A peculiarity of the littoral Dinarids is the precipitation regime as the settlements of Orjen receive more precipitation than any others in Europe. Like the monsoon rain it is seasonally distributed, thus November thunderstorms sometimes pour 2000 liters of water in several days, while August is frequently completely dry, leading to forest fires. With a maximum discharge of 350 m³/s water one of the biggest karst springs, the Sopot spring near Risan, is a remarkable indicator of this seasonality. Most of the time it is inactive but after heavy rain a remarkable waterfall appears 20 m above the Bay of Kotor.

Two wind systems are noteworthy for their ecological significance: bora and jugo. Strong cold downslope winds of Bura type appear in winter and are most severe in the Bay of Risan. Gusts reach 250 km/h and can lead to a significant fall of temperatures in several hours with freezing events problematic for most of the Mediterranean cultures. Jugo is a warm humid wind and is important as it brings heavy rain. It appears throughout the year but is most frequent in autumn and spring.

History

The region came under Venetian rule after the Cretan War (1645–69). The Bay of Kotor, part of Venetian Albania, was also called "Upper Dalmatia". The first mention of Krivošije is from a Venetian report dated 1686, in which 15–20 houses are mentioned in the village.

Krivošije was under Austro-Hungarian control (as part of the Kingdom of Dalmatia) since the Congress of Vienna in 1814. In 1869 an uprising of the local population, which was Orthodox, defeated an expedition force of the powerful Austro-Hungarian army that was attempting to enforce compulsory military service; Austria-Hungary abandoned its efforts, for the time being. Volunteers from the region joined the Serb rebels in the Herzegovina Uprising (1875–77). Austro-Hungarian forces returned in 1881, defeating the rebels. Austria-Hungary immediately began to pacify the region with heavy investment in tremendous fortifications that would make the military harbour in the gulf safe from Montenegrin and Russian aspirations.

During World War II, population of Krivošije was equally divided between Partisans and Chetniks. After 1942 and before capitulation of Italy, region was Chetnik stronghold. Local merchant Miloš Kovač organized an armed band of 80 men in Krivošije which threatened Yugoslav Partisan access and control in the region. However, two Partisan detachments were also established in Krivošije under the Communist Party cell in Herceg Novi. In September 1944, the battles of the 10th Montenegrin NOV brigade in Krivošije had the largest echo in the Bay of Kotor and Paštrovići.

Demographics
Mountainous Krivošije region was mostly inhabited by the tribes of Old Montenegro, but also partially by settlers from Herzegovina. The following families were listed as inhabitants of Krivošije: Radulović, Vučurović, Samardžić, Odalović, Kovač, Radojičić, Ilić, Bojanić, Kokotović, Vukićević, Komnenović, Tomović, Vodovar, Žmukić, Popović, Blagojević, Lakićević, Subotić, Miletić, Vidović and Lazović.

Krivošije region faced significant demographic outflows in recent decades, particularly towards the Bay of Kotor. As of 2018, Krivošije, which covers roughly a third of the Kotor Municipality, has only around 110 permanent residents, in comparison with 1,053 inhabitants recorded in 1953.

Culture
Most common slava (patron saint day) of the Krivošije clan is St. John the Baptist (Jovanjdan), celebrated on 20 January.

The following churches were built in Krivošije:

Church of St. Petka in Poljice, built in the second half of the 17th or 18th century.
Pokrov Bogorodice in Dragalj, built in 1867.
Roždestvo Bogorodice in Malov Do, built in 1831.
Church of St. John in Zvečava, built in the second half of the 17th century.

A species of funnel-web spider called Histopona krivosijana was named after the region after its discovery there in 1935.

References

Sources

 

 
Regions of Montenegro
Plateaus of Europe
Tribes of Montenegro
Kotor Municipality
Orjen